This page lists the winners and nominees for the Soul Train Music Ashford & Simpson Songwriter's Award. Also referred to as Record of the Year, this award was first given in 2009. John Legend currently holds the most awards in this category, with three, and Beyoncé holds the most nominations with nine.

Winners and nominees
Winners are listed first and highlighted in bold.

2000s

2010s

2020s

See also
 Soul Train Music Award for Stevie Wonder Award – Outstanding Achievement in Songwriting

References

Soul Train Music Awards
Song awards